Borea may refer to:

Borea, Wisconsin, an unincorporated community in the United States
Borea, an invalid synonym of the moth genus Eudonia
SC Borea Dresden, a German football club 

People:
Alberto Borea, Peruvian lawyer and politician
Evelina Borea, Italian art historian and curator
Vera Borea, French fashion designer

Air and water craft:
Teichfuss Borea or LT.35 Borea, an Italian high performance glider 
Caproni Ca.308 Borea, a small Italian airliner
SS Borea, a hotel and museum ship now known as the MS Bore

See also
Boreas (disambiguation)
Boreal (disambiguation)